Eupithecia undiculata is a moth in the family Geometridae. It is found in Kenya, South Africa, Tanzania, Uganda and Zimbabwe.

Subspecies
Eupithecia undiculata undiculata
Eupithecia undiculata glaucata D. S. Fletcher, 1956

References

Moths described in 1932
undiculata
Moths of Africa